
Carlo Bigatto (29 August 1895 – 16 September 1942) was an Italian football player and coach who played as a midfielder.

Club career
Bigatto spent his entire club career playing football for Italian side Juventus, also serving as team captain, and winning two Serie A titles.

International career
Bigatto also played for the Italy national football team five times between 1925 and 1927.

Managerial career
After his retirement Bigatto returned to Juventus in a managerial role during the latter part of the 1934–35 season in which Juventus won the league over Inter by two points; before Virginio Rosetta took over the following year.

Honours

Player
Juventus
 Serie A: 1925–26, 1930–31

Manager
Juventus
 Serie A: 1934–35

See also
One-club man

References

1895 births
1942 deaths
People from Balzola
Italian footballers
Italy international footballers
Juventus F.C. players
Association football midfielders
Footballers from Piedmont
Sportspeople from the Province of Alessandria